The Sapucaí River is a river of the states of São Paulo and Minas Gerais in southeastern Brazil. It is a tributary of the Rio Grande.

Course

The headwaters of the river are protected by the  Sapucaí Mirim Environmental Protection Area, created in 1998.
The  Fernão Dias Environmental Protection Area, created in 1997, also protects some of the headwaters.
In its upper reaches in São Paulo state the Sapucaí River flows through the  Campos do Jordão State Park, created in 1941.
To the north of the park, for a short section the river forms the border between São Paulo and Minas Gerais, before flowing north into Minas Gerais.
It flows through the town of Itajubá, then continues north and is joined from the left by the Sapucaí-Mirim River to the east of Pouso Alegre.

See also
List of rivers of Minas Gerais

References

Rivers of Minas Gerais